Barlaston Parish Council governs the village of Barlaston. The council appoints one councillor who is then known as the chairman or chairwoman. The current chairperson is Councillor Paul Fisher.

Barlaston Parish Council comprises three wards – Barlaston East, Barlaston West, and Barlaston Park. These wards are represented by eleven parish councillors.

Current composition

Election history
Barlaston Parish Council is made up of up of eleven councillors elected from three wards.

2020 - 2021 co-opted election
After the resignation of a councillor in 2020 & then another in early 2021, these vacancies were advertised & filled by independents.

2019 election
The 2019 Barlaston Parish Council elections an uncontested election occurred in which all eleven seats were filled by independents. This was held alongside the Neighbourhood Plan Referendum on 7 May 2019.

Neighbourhood Plan
In 2009 the Barlaston Parish Council undertook to produce a Village Plan and to focus on a number of local issues, this Village Plan is now referred to as the Neighbourhood Plan following the passing of the Localism Act 2011. The Localism Act introduced new rights and powers to allow local communities to shape new development by coming together to prepare neighbourhood plans parish councils can use new neighbourhood planning powers to establish general planning policies for the development and use of land in a neighbourhood.  The Barlaston Neighbourhood Plan was made and then adopted on 23 July 2019 following a referendum which was held on Thursday 2 May 2019.

References 

Parish councils of England
Local authorities in Staffordshire
Parish Council